Wyresdale Park is an English country house and licensed wedding ceremony venue located within the Forest of Bowland to the northeast of Scorton, Lancashire, England.

History
It was built in 1856–58, and designed by the Lancaster architect E. G. Paley for the Ormrod family of Bolton. It has since been extended and outbuildings have been added. The hall is in Gothic Revival style. A lake was added to the grounds in 1897.

The hall and surrounding parkland were purchased in the 1920s by the Riddell family, and the farms and fell land by the Whewell family. In 1967, the hall was also bought by the Whewells. By the 2000s the hall continued to be in a satisfactory condition, but the outbuildings were in a poor state and the gardens were overgrown. The family worked with Ruth Watson, and cooperated with the Channel 4's programme Country House Rescue, creating a café and arranging Open Days. The hall and its surrounding outbuildings are recorded in the National Heritage List for England as a designated Grade II listed building.

The Ormrod Family

Peter Ormrod (1796–1875) built Wyresdale Hall in 1856. He bought 6,000-acres from the Duke of Hamilton to create the estate. The house cost £50,000 (about £4m at today’s value). The architect was Edward Graham Paley who designed many outstanding buildings in Lancashire. Peter was a banker and cotton manufacturer. His father James was one of the founders of the Bolton Bank (now the Royal Bank of Scotland) and on his death in 1825 Peter inherited the Partnership in the bank. In 1838 Peter married Eliza Hardcastle who was the daughter of one of his partners. On their marriage his father in law, Thomas Hardcastle gave him Halliwell Hall and Peter made major alterations to this house. He also provided the entire funding for rebuilding the parish Church in Bolton.

The couple had no children and therefore when Peter died in 1875 Wyresdale Park was left to his nephew James Cross Ormrod . However his wife Eliza was given a life interest in the house and she remained there until her death in 1890. When James Cross Ormrod died in 1895 his son Captain Peter Ormrod (1869–1923) inherited the Estate.

Captain Peter Ormrod was a very outgoing man and made major improvements to the property. His most outstanding achievement was the establishment of the Wyresdale Fishery which was said to be the largest in Europe (see photos below). Two feature articles were written in 1899 in the magazine "Country Life" about this Fishery. He also added a deer park and a lake to the estate. In 1899 it was widely reported in many newspapers that Peter had bought the whole of the fallow deer in Barningham Park the seat of Sir F. A. Millbank.

In about 1912 Dame Laura Knight visited Wyresdale Park with her husband Harold at the request of the then owner Captain Peter Ormrod. In her autobiography she mentions that during her stay she was inspired to paint "the grounds, the byres and the fells." One of these paintings was called "The Morning Ride" which depicts the fountain which still exists today in the grounds of Wyresdale Park. A link to this painting is given at this reference.  A photo of the fountain as it is today is given at this reference.

In 1922 Peter sold Wyresdale Park. An advertisement for the sale is shown below. The Estate was split with the house and surrounding grounds being sold to Dr Hugh Riddell and a large portion of the remaining land to Shepherd Whewell.

The Whewell family

The estate broke up in the 1930s when the Riddell family bought the hall and grounds. Shepherd Whewell, purchased much of the land. From the 1960s, Shepherd Whewell and his brother started re-uniting parcels of the estate including the house and concentrated on hunting partridge, pheasant and mallard. But trying to maintain such a costly concern on the income of 800 acres started to become a strain and action was needed to find new revenues. In 2011, Jim Whewell Jr. and his sister Sarah persuaded their parents to transform parts of the grounds around into a boutique camping destination.

The family was pointed in a different direction when they featured on Channel 4’s Country House Rescue, a show where presenter Ruth Watson gives blunt advice to owners of estates and stately piles struggling to keep their heads above water. 
The Whewell's first step was to convert the brick outbuildings and glasshouse in the walled garden into the Applestore Café, which is run by Sally Whewell. The next step was tapping into the 'glamping' market with two different experiences, Feather Down Lodges and The Orchard Bell Tents, both situated by the boating lake. In 2018, the estate moved into a new phase after restoring a large collection of Victorian barn buildings – a full set of stables, haylofts, a shippon and a piggery into unique spaces, especially for weddings. Co-worker shared office spaces have also been established, under James Whewell's’ guidance, to assist start-ups businesses and establish a creative community.

Visitor attractions
 Applestore Cafe
 Nicky Nook Fell
 Licensed wedding ceremony barns

Events, filming and press
 Wyresdale Park featured on Drew Pritchard’s Salvage Hunters in 2017.
 In September 2011, Wyresdale Park featured on Channel 4's Country House Rescue, which was the first episode in Series 3 and was first broadcast at 21:00 on 6 March.
 Crafty Vintage hosted Christmas Makers Markets in 2017 and 2018.
 Nicky Nook Fell hosted a road stage of the North West Stages car rally on 23 March 2019.
 The Financial Times featured Wyresdale Park to highlight how diversification is being applied to Country houses in the United Kingdom.
 The Applestore Cafe at Wyresdale Park was featured on the front page of the I (newspaper) on 24 August 2019 as a suggested alternative for motorists using Lancaster (Forton) Services.

Awards
 1965: Snowhill Lane Bridge - Civic Trust Award
 2018: Marketing Lancashire Tourism Superstar - Finalist
 2019: Great Northern Wedding Awards - Best Wedding Venue - Barn / Farm - Finalist
 2019: Great Northern Wedding Awards - Best Creative Space - Finalist

See also

Listed buildings in Nether Wyresdale
List of non-ecclesiastical works by E. G. Paley

References

External links
Wyresdale Park

Country houses in Lancashire
Buildings and structures in the Borough of Wyre
Grade II listed buildings in Lancashire
Gothic Revival architecture in Lancashire
Tourist attractions in Lancashire
E. G. Paley buildings